José Isabel Trejo Reyes (born 9 April 1959) is a Mexican politician affiliated with the PAN. As of 2013 he served as Deputy of both the LIX and LXII Legislatures of the Mexican Congress representing Zacatecas. He also served as Senator during the LX and LXI Legislatures.

References

1959 births
Living people
People from Zacatecas
Members of the Senate of the Republic (Mexico)
Members of the Chamber of Deputies (Mexico)
National Action Party (Mexico) politicians
21st-century Mexican politicians